Aïn Touila  is a town and commune in Khenchela Province, Algeria. According to the 1998 census it has a population of 14,769.

References

Communes of Khenchela Province